Sucheep Likittay (born 1 April 1952) is a Thai former cyclist. He competed in the team time trial event at the 1976 Summer Olympics.

References

External links
 

1952 births
Living people
Sucheep Likittay
Sucheep Likittay
Cyclists at the 1976 Summer Olympics
Place of birth missing (living people)
Sucheep Likittay